Wang Jin-yong (born 27 November 1975 in Taiwan) is a retired Taiwanese professional baseball player who played for Brother Elephants of the Chinese Professional Baseball League (CPBL) his entire career.

Career statistics

References

External links
 

1975 births
Living people
Brother Elephants coaches
Baseball first basemen
Brother Elephants players
Fu Jen Catholic University alumni
People from Taitung County
Taiwanese baseball players
CTBC Brothers coaches